Zayed Stadium can refer to several stadiums named after members of the Al Nahyan family in the United Arab Emirates.

Zayed Sports City Stadium in Abu Dhabi
Sheikh Zayed Cricket Stadium in Abu Dhabi
Hazza bin Zayed Stadium in Al Ain, named after Hazza bin Zayed bin Sultan Al Nahyan
Mohammed bin Zayed Stadium in Abu Dhabi, named after Mohammed bin Zayed Al Nahyan
Khalifa bin Zayed Stadium in Al Ain, named after Khalifa bin Zayed Al Nahyan

See also

List of football stadiums in the United Arab Emirates
Al Nahyan Stadium

Sports venues in the United Arab Emirates